Suicide Hill is a summit in Wheatland County, Montana, in the United States.

References

Mountains of Wheatland County, Montana
Mountains of Montana